Mucilaginibacter herbaticus is a Gram-negative, strictly aerobic, rod-shaped and non-motile bacterium from the genus of Mucilaginibacter which has been isolated from rhizosphere soil from the plant Angelica sinensis.

References

External links
Type strain of Mucilaginibacter herbaticus at BacDive -  the Bacterial Diversity Metadatabase

Sphingobacteriia
Bacteria described in 2013